Kirsten Larsen (born 14 March 1962) is a retired female badminton player from Denmark.

Career
Larsen won the All England final in 1987 in singles. She also won three bronze medals at the Badminton World Cup in 1980, 1985 and 1986 and a gold medal in 1988 European championships. She was also Danish champion in singles from 1981 to 1983 and again from 1986 to 1988, and she was called Lene Køppen's successor. Kirsten won the European Championships in singles in 1988 and became second in 1986. She also became Nordic Champion in singles in 1983, 1984, 1986, 1987 and 1988. Kirsten Larsen played for the national team 58 times from 1979 to 1990.

In 2014, she received the Women in Badminton Award by the Badminton World Federation, for her significant contribution towards the active participation of women in high-performance badminton.

Achievements

World Cup

European Championships

European Junior Championships

IBF World Grand Prix 
The World Badminton Grand Prix sanctioned by International Badminton Federation (IBF) from 1983 to 2006.

International tournaments

Personal information
She married the former Danish badminton player Steen Fladberg. Their son Rasmus Fladberg is also a professional badminton player.

References

External links
Kirsten Larsen's Profile - Badminton.dk

Danish female badminton players
Living people
1962 births
Badminton players at the 1988 Summer Olympics